Orós Bajo (Aragonese: Orós Baxo) is a population unit situated in the municipality of Biescas, Spain. In 2019, it had a population of 22 inhabitants.

Monuments 
The church of Saint Eulalia forms part of the Serrablo churches, a group of early-romanesque and mozarabic churches.

References 

Huesca
Geography of Spain